Slovakia participated in the Eurovision Song Contest 2009 with the song "Leť tmou" written by Rastislav Dubovský, Petronela Kolevská and Anna Žigová. The song was performed by Kamil Mikulčík and Nela Pocisková. In September 2008, the Slovak broadcaster Slovenská televízia (STV) announced that they would return to the Eurovision Song Contest after an eleven-year absence. The broadcaster selected the Slovak entry for the 2009 contest in Moscow, Russia through the national final Eurosong 2009. 50 entries competed in the national final which consisted of six shows: five semi-finals and a final. In the semi-finals, three entries were selected to advance from each show: two entries selected based on the votes from the public and one entry selected by a seven-member jury panel. A wildcard entry was also selected by the jury from the remaining entries to advance. Sixteen entries ultimately qualified to compete in the final on 8 March 2009 where a public vote selected three of the entries to proceed to a second round of voting. In the second round of voting, "Leť tmou" performed by Kamil Mikulčík and Nela Pocisková was selected as the winner after scoring the most points from the jury.

Slovakia was drawn to compete in the second semi-final of the Eurovision Song Contest which took place on 14 May 2009. Performing during the show in position 7, "Leť tmou" was not announced among the top 10 entries of the second semi-final and therefore did not qualify to compete in the final. It was later revealed that Slovakia placed eighteenth out of the 19 participating countries in the semi-final with 8 points.

Background 

The nation's best placing in the contest was eighteenth, which it achieved in 1996 with the song "Kým nás máš" performed by Marcel Palonder. Slovakia's least successful result has been 21st place, which they have achieved in 1998 with the song "Modlitba" performed by Katarína Hasprová.

The Slovak national broadcaster, Slovenská televízia (STV), broadcasts the event within Slovakia and organises the selection process for the nation's entry. STV had selected all of their Eurovision entries through an internal selection. On 24 September 2008, STV announced their return to the Eurovision Song Contest in 2009 after an eleven-year absence. The program director of STV Roman Lipták stated that the pressure from local artists was the driving force behind the country's return.

Before Eurovision

Eurosong 2009 

Eurosong 2009 was the national final format developed by STV in order to select Slovakia's entry for the Eurovision Song Contest 2009. The competition consisted of six shows which commenced on 15 February 2009 and concluded with a final on 8 March 2009. The six shows took place at the STV studios in Bratislava and hosted by Martin Rausch. All shows in the competition were broadcast on Jednotka as well as online at the broadcaster's official website stv.sk.

Format 
The format of the competition consisted of six shows: five semi-finals on 15 February 2009, 20 February 2009, 22 February 2009, 27 February 2009 and 1 March 2009, and a final on 8 March 2009. Results during each show were determined by a jury panel and votes from the public. The semi-finals each featured ten entries from which the songs first faced a public vote where the top two entries qualified to the final. The jury then selected an additional qualifier from the remaining entries to advance. The jury also selected a wildcard qualifier for the final out of the remaining non-qualifying acts from the semi-finals. In the final, the winner was determined over two rounds of voting. In the first round, the remaining sixteen entries faced a public vote where the top three entries qualified to the second round of voting. In the second round, the winner was determined exclusively by the jury. The initial format of the competition consisted of four shows: three semi-finals and a final. Four entries were to advance from each semi-final with three selected by a public vote and one selected by the jury, however, an additional two semi-final shows were included due to the amount and quality of the received submissions. Viewers were able to vote via SMS.

The seven-member jury panel participated in each show and selected entries to advance in the competition. The jury consisted of:
 Laco Lučenič – Musician and music producer
 Katarína Hasprová – Singer, represented Slovakia in the Eurovision Song Contest 1998
 Marcel Palonder – Singer, represented Slovakia in the Eurovision Song Contest 1996
 Anton Popovič – Composer
 Mirka Brezovská – Singer
 Dezider Kukoľ – Editor at The News Agency of the Slovak Republic (TASR)
 Lukáš Machala – Representative of STV

Competing entries 
Artists and composers were able to submit their entries between 20 November 2008 and 20 January 2009. Artists were required to hold Slovak citizenship and songs were required to be performed in Slovak. The broadcaster received 177 submissions at the closing of the deadline and an expert committee selected fifty entries for the competition. The competing entries were announced on 3 February 2009.

Semi-finals
Five semi-finals took place in February and March 2009. Ten of the competing entries were assigned to each semi-final and in each show three entries qualified to the final. The competing entries first faced a public vote where the top two songs advanced; an additional qualifier was then selected from the remaining entries by the jury. An additional wildcard was also awarded by the jury to one of the eliminated entries, which also qualified for the final.

The third semi-final was originally scheduled to take place on 22 February 2009, however due to a train accident in Bratislava on 21 February 2009 which led to a day of mourning in Slovakia, the semi-final was postponed to 23 February 2009 instead.

Desmod and Lucia Nováková were due to perform in the first semi-final, however they were later reallocated to perform in the fifth semi-final following an accident during the rehearsals. After qualifying from semi-final 5, Desmod and Lucia Nováková withdrew from the final and the jury selected Smola a hrušky as the replacement qualifier for their semi-final.

Final
The final took place on 8 March 2009 where the sixteen entries that qualified from the semi-finals competed. The winner was selected over two rounds of voting. In the first round, the top three entries as determined by a public vote advanced to the second round, the superfinal. In the superfinal, the jury selected "Leť tmou" performed by Kamil Mikulčík and Nela Pocisková as the winner. In addition to the performances of the competing entries, guest performers included 2009 Azerbaijani Eurovision entrants AySel and Arash performing "Always", and 2009 Czech Eurovision entrants Gipsy.cz performing "Aven Romale".

At Eurovision
According to Eurovision rules, all nations with the exceptions of the host country and the "Big Four" (France, Germany, Spain and the United Kingdom) are required to qualify from one of two semi-finals in order to compete for the final; the top ten countries from each semi-final progress to the final. The European Broadcasting Union (EBU) split up the competing countries into six different pots based on voting patterns from previous contests, with countries with favourable voting histories put into the same pot. On 30 January 2009, a special allocation draw was held which placed each country into one of the two semi-finals. Slovakia was placed into the second semi-final, to be held on 14 May 2009.

The running order for the semi-finals was decided through another draw on 16 March 2009 and Slovakia was set to perform in position 8, following the entry from Cyprus and before the entry from Denmark. At the end of the second semi-final, Slovakia was not announced among the top 10 entries in the second semi-final and therefore failed to qualify to compete in the final. This marked the first time that Slovakia failed to qualify to the final of the Eurovision Song Contest from a semi-final since the introduction of semi-finals in 2004. It was later revealed that Slovakia placed eighteenth in the semi-final, receiving a total of 8 points.

The two semi-finals and the final were broadcast in Slovakia on Dvojka with commentary by Roman Bomboš. The Slovak spokesperson, who announced the top 12-point score awarded by Slovakia during the final, was Ľubomír Bajaník.

Voting 
The voting system for 2009 involved each country awarding points from 1-8, 10 and 12, with the points in the final being decided by a combination of 50% national jury and 50% televoting. Each nation's jury consisted of five music industry professionals who are citizens of the country they represent. This jury judged each entry based on: vocal capacity; the stage performance; the song's composition and originality; and the overall impression by the act. In addition, no member of a national jury was permitted to be related in any way to any of the competing acts in such a way that they cannot vote impartially and independently.

Below is a breakdown of points awarded to Slovakia and awarded by Slovakia in the second semi-final and grand final of the contest. The nation awarded its 12 points to Azerbaijan in the semi-final and to Estonia in the final of the contest.

Points awarded to Slovakia

Points awarded by Slovakia

Detailed voting results

References

2009
Countries in the Eurovision Song Contest 2009
Eurovision
Eurovision